MacCormick is a surname. Notable people with the surname include:

Bill MacCormick (born 1951), English bassist and vocalist
Cara Duff-MacCormick, Canadian actress best known for her work in American theatre
Charles MacCormick (1862–1945), New Zealand cricketer
Donald MacCormick (1939–2009), Scottish broadcast journalist
Evan MacCormick (1882–1918), New Zealand cricketer and barrister
Iain MacCormick (born 1939), Scottish National Party (SNP) politician
John MacCormick (1904–1961), lawyer and advocate of Home Rule in Scotland
Neil MacCormick (1941–2009), legal philosopher and Scottish politician
Niall MacCormick, television director for the BBC

See also
MacCormick v Lord Advocate (1953 SC 396), Scottish legal action in which John MacCormick (Rector of the University of Glasgow) and Ian Hamilton (then part of the Glasgow University Scottish Nationalist Association) contested the right of Queen Elizabeth II to style herself ‘Elizabeth II’ within Scotland
MacCormick Fjord
McCormick (surname)
McCormack